Agigea is a commune in Constanța County, Northern Dobruja, Romania. The commune includes four villages: Agigea, Lazu (Turkish: Laz-Mahale), Sanatoriul Agigea and Stațiunea Zoologică Marină Agigea, the last two being special settlements.

Demographics
At the 2011 census, Agigea had 5,822 Romanians (90.46%), 443 Tatars (6.88%), 95 Turks (1.48%), 15 Roma  (0.23%), 10 Lipovans (0.16%), 9 Aromanians (0.14%), 8 Hungarians (0.12%), 29 others (0.45%), 5 with undeclared ethnicity (0.08%).

Infrastructure
In the western urban area at 44°5'23"N 28°36'12"E, there is a mediumwave transmitter operating on 1458 kHz. North of Agigea at  44°6'19"N 28°37'49"E, there is Constanța coast radio station, which serves also for transmitting NAVTEX-messages in Romanian language on 490 kHz.

References

Communes in Constanța County
Localities in Northern Dobruja
Populated coastal places in Romania
Place names of Turkish origin in Romania